The Wizarding World of Harry Potter is a themed area based on the Harry Potter series built at Universal Parks & Resorts' Universal Studios Japan theme park in Osaka, Japan. Not to be confused with Warner Bros. Studio Tour London - The Making of Harry Potter at Leavesden Studios, it is a collaboration of Universal Parks & Resorts and Warner Bros. Entertainment. It opened to the public on July 15, 2014.

It contains the Harry Potter and the Forbidden Journey ride and the Flight of the Hippogriff roller coaster that debuted at the Wizarding World of Harry Potter at Universal Orlando Resort in 2010. The village of Hogsmeade is also recreated. Two features in the Japanese park not found in Orlando are Hogwarts's Black Lake and live owls.

Attractions 
The table below shows the different attractions across the park.

See also
The Wizarding World of Harry Potter
The Wizarding World of Harry Potter (Universal Orlando Resort)
The Wizarding World of Harry Potter (Universal Studios Hollywood)
The Wizarding World of Harry Potter (Universal Studios Beijing)
Warner Bros. Studio Tour London, studio tour exhibiting original costumes, props and sets used in all eight films

References

Amusement rides introduced in 2014
Harry Potter in amusement parks
Licensed properties at Universal Parks & Resorts
2014 establishments in Japan
2018 disestablishments in Japan